Lanjing (蓝鲸) is a self-propelled, deep water crane vessel, owned by China National Offshore Oil Corporation (CNOOC), the national oil exploration company of China, through its Hong Kong-listed subsidiary CNOOC Limited. Built in 2012, it is one of the six large crane barges owned by COOEC and CNOOC, namely HYSY201, Lanjing, Blue Xinjiang, Binhai 109, HYSY286, HYSY289 and HYSY291.

History
Lanjing was built as MT Sanko Pioneer, a VLCC. In 1997, she was purchased by a new owner and her name was changed to MT Torres Spirit. In 2005, she was sold and renamed MT Zhen Hua 15 by her new owner. Subsequently, she was purchased by CNOOC and COOEC, and converted into a large crane vessel. Her conversion and outfitting took nearly two years and was completed in July 2008.

Vessel particulars
Equipped with a large 7,500 tonnes lifting capacity crane, an additional 4,000 tonnes crane and an auxiliary 1,600 tonnes hook, a long stinger and extensive equipment for lifting and lowering exceptionally heavy equipment and oil rigs, Lanjing is the largest crane vessel in the world (as of 2019). It has been engaged in numerous projects across the world, including installing some of the largest oil rigs in the world, building some of the largest bridges off the coast of China, and laying sub sea oil pipelines as well as installing offshore structures in the South China Sea and off Myanmar (Zawtika). In recent years, it has been part of large-scale offshore projects in Myanmar (Zawtika project), off Hainan and off Brunei for the "Hengyi project".

References

1990 ships